San Marcos is a town, with a population of 5,660 (2013 census), and a municipality in the Honduran department of Santa Bárbara. Since 2006 it has been known as the "La Capital de los Juegos Tradicionales de Honduras" (The Capital of Traditional Honduran Games")

Demographics
At the time of the 2013 Honduras census, San Marcos municipality had a population of 15,229. Of these, 88.36% were Mestizo, 10.97% White, 0.41% Black or Afro-Honduran, 0.23% Indigenous and 0.02% others.

References 

Municipalities of the Santa Bárbara Department, Honduras